Eppie's Great Race is a multisport race held each summer in the Sacramento metropolitan area. It was founded by restaurateur/entrepreneur Eppie G. Johnson in 1974.  Participants include elite athletes, fitness enthusiasts, average runners, and families who complete the race within 1.5 to 4.5 hours.

Also known as "The Great Race", "The World's Oldest Triathlon" and the "No-Swim Triathlon", it features a 5.82-mile run, 12.5-mile bike and 6.35-mile paddle held along the scenic American River Parkway in Rancho Cordova and Sacramento, California. The event attracts more than 2000 participants each year with 26 divisions and is the largest paddling event in the continental United States.  Participants come from all over the world, with the farthest competitor coming from Hong Kong in 2011.

Ten days before the race, "Great Team Day" establishes a timing for running, biking, and kayaking portions of the race.  An Ironwoman, Ironman, and Team (consisting of local celebrities and corporate sponsors volunteers) race along the American River Parkway to establish the time to beat.  On race day, participants beating these Great Team times win a complimentary breakfast at a local restaurant, not to mention the bragging rights to say "I beat the Great Team Time."

In 2005, a concurrently running and cycling Kid's Duathlon put on by Eppie's Great Race was introduced to area youth.

Both events are presented by Eppie's Great Race Foundation and are the primary beneficiary to Sacramento County Therapeutic Recreational Services, which is part of the County Parks System, assisting with the disabled community in recreational services. To date, Eppie's Great Race Foundation has donated more than $1 million to this cause.

Eppie's Great Race celebrated its 40th anniversary in 2013.

The 2014 Great Race was the first without founder Eppie Johnson, who died in September 2013.

The 2018 Great Race was the last one.

References

External links 
 http://www.eppiesgreatrace.org/
 https://web.archive.org/web/20111021142643/http://www.sacbee.com/2011/07/23/3789426/eppies-great-race-underway-along.html
 https://web.archive.org/web/20120720090123/http://sacramentopress.com/headline/63510/New_Look_for_Worlds_Oldest_Triathlon_Eppies_Great_Race
 http://www.mtdemocrat.com/sports/donene-vukovich-wins-eppies-ironwoman-race/
 http://benicia.patch.com/articles/video-local-ironman-shares-triathlon-experience#video-7151074
 https://web.archive.org/web/20111021144314/http://www.sacbee.com/2011/07/24/3790360/eppies-great-race-volunteers-corral.html
 https://web.archive.org/web/20111021142643/http://www.sacbee.com/2011/07/23/3789426/eppies-great-race-underway-along.html
 https://web.archive.org/web/20120412095048/http://www.sacbee.com/2011/07/23/3789979/snapshots-eppies-great-race-july.html
 https://web.archive.org/web/20120411164504/http://www.news10.net/news/article/146699/2/Eppies-Great-Race-contestants-prep-for-Saturday
 https://web.archive.org/web/20111012225940/http://www.sacramentopress.com/headline/53609/Eppies_Great_Race_A_race_with_something_for_everyone
 https://web.archive.org/web/20120412101848/http://www.sacbee.com/2011/07/21/3782648/eppies-champ-nicole-young-overcomes.html
 https://web.archive.org/web/20120412101049/http://www.sacbee.com/2011/07/18/3777298/eppies-great-race-looking-for.html
 http://www.mtdemocrat.com/sports/ironwoman-champ-will-race-again/
 https://archive.today/20130222065038/http://www.sacramentotoday.net/news/templates/community.asp?articleid=1790&zoneid=1
 http://www.news10.net/news/local/story.aspx?storyid=145205

Triathlon competitions
Recurring sporting events established in 1974
Annual sporting events in the United States
Sports in Sacramento County, California
Triathlon in the United States